National Archaeological Museum of Korçë is a museum in Korçë, Albania. It contains around 1200 artifacts 
mainly from the Prehistoric period.

Collection

See also 
Museum of Archaeology in Tirana (Albania)
Durrës Archaeological Museum
Museum of Apollonia

References

Buildings and structures in Korçë
A
Korçë
Tourist attractions in Korçë
Museums in Korçë